Indiva is a publicly-traded company based in London, Ontario. The company operates in the Canadian cannabis industry, producing and supplying cannabis and cannabis products for both the legal recreational and medical markets.  Indiva was founded in 2015 by Koby Smutylo, Max Marion, and Niel Marotta.

Products 
Indiva currently produces and supplies THC & CBD dried cannabis flower, pre-rolls, capsules and edibles.

Partnerships 
In April 2018, Indiva entered a licensed joint-venture with Deepcell and Ruby Edibles to produce cannabis-infused salt and sugar. Indiva also has relationships with Bhang chocolates and Wana gummies. In January 2019, Indiva completed an equity investment of 9.9% in Cannabis Retailer RetailGo (RGI).

References 

Companies listed on the TSX Venture Exchange
Companies based in London, Ontario
Canadian companies established in 2015
Cannabis companies of Canada